Dedicated to… is the debut studio album by German pop singer Sasha, released by Warner Music on 16 November 1998 in German-speaking Europe. A compiled edition, also including songs of follow-up album ...you (2000), was released under the same name on 27 March 2001 in Canada and the United States.

A "blend of romantic ballads and quicker funk- and reggae-inspired tracks," according to Billboard, the album was initially released in fall 1998 and became a major success around Europe, selling more than 400,000 copies in Germany alone. It reached the top ten of the albums charts in Austria, Germany, Norway, and Switzerland, and was certified platinum and quintuple gold around Europe.

The album produced four singles, including "If You Believe," which would become his highest-charting single to date and reached the top five in Austria, Belgium, Germany, the Netherlands and Switzerland, receiving one platinum and four gold discs. With lead single "I'm Still Waitin'", "We Can Leave the World" and "I Feel Lonely" the album spawned two further top ten hits.

Track listing

Notes
  denotes additional producer

Charts

Weekly charts

Year-end charts

Certifications

References

External links 
 Sasha.de — official site

1998 debut albums
Sasha (German singer) albums
Warner Music Group albums
Reprise Records albums